Teia (died 552 or 553 AD), also known as Teja, Theia, Thila, Thela, and Teias, was the last Ostrogothic King of Italy. He led troops during the Battle of Busta Gallorum and had noncombatant Romans slaughtered in its aftermath. In late 552/early 553, he was killed during the Battle of Mons Lactarius. Archaeological records attesting to his rule show up in coinage found in former Transalpine Gaul.

Life
Teia (Teja) was a military officer serving under Totila, who was chosen as his successor and raised over a shield after Totila was killed in the Battle of Taginae (also known as the Battle of Busta Gallorum) in July 552. After this major Gothic defeat Teia gathered together  the remaining Goths. In an act of revenge for the losses at Busta Gallorum, Teia ordered the death of all the Roman senators in Campania including Flavius Maximus, who had been exiled by Belisarius. He also had some 300 Roman children slaughtered, whom Totila had held hostage. Teia then made his way to Pavia, where he took possession of the available treasures and as the new king, made a pact with the Franks.

On his way fleeing to southern Italy, he gathered support from prominent figures within Totila's armies, including Scipuar, Gundulf (Indulf), Gibal and Ragnaris, to make his last stand against the Byzantine eunuch general Narses at the Battle of Mons Lactarius—south of present-day Naples near Nuceria Alfaterna—in late 552/early 553. Historian Guy Halsall called this battle, which occurred in the shadow of Mount Vesuvius, a "cataclysmic showdown." The Ostrogothic army was defeated there and Teia fell during the fighting. His head was paraded around the battlefield by the Romans, but as Peter Heather relates, "the Goths kept on fighting until dusk on that day and all through the next." Other prominent Goths like Scipuar and Gibal were probably also killed during the fighting. Those Goths who survived the battle and remained, negotiated an armistice. Gundulf and Ragnaris escaped from the field; the latter was later mortally wounded after a failed assassination attempt by an agent of Narses. With that defeat, organized Ostrogothic resistance ended. By 554, the Ostrogothic Kingdom had faded into obscurity, and the Gothic people who remained began assimilating into the broader Italian population.

Although his reign was brief, silver coins in his name circulated all the way from his capital at Pavia along the Alpine trade routes into Gaul.

References

Sources

 
 

 
 
 
 

550s deaths
Ostrogothic kings
6th-century kings of Italy
6th-century monarchs in Europe
Gothic warriors
People of the Gothic War (535–554)
Year of birth unknown
6th-century Ostrogothic people
Monarchs killed in action